Breaking the News is a 1912 Australian melodrama film directed by W. J. Lincoln based on John Longstaff's 1887 painting of the same name.

It is considered a lost film.

Plot
A prospector looks for a wife to live with him and eventually gets married. While he is in town, the mine floods and miners need to be rescued. The main scenes were:
mining machinations;
a woman's sacrifice;
a man's desperation and love;
a father's sad mistake
man's sure revenge.

Cast
Harrie Ireland
Arthur Styan

Production
The film was shot at Diamond Creek, near Melbourne.

Reception
The movie was a popular success with critics drawing particular attention to a scene of an underground mine being flooded. In March 1912 The Bulletin wrote "cheers   for   the   big   black   and   white   item, “Breaking   the   News.”   The   yarn   is   excellently   acted   and   photographed,   but   the   plot is   not   too   conspicuous for   common-sense."

References

External links
Breaking the News at IMDb
Breaking the News at National Film and Sound Archive
Breaking the News at AustLit

1912 films
Australian black-and-white films
Australian silent feature films
Lost Australian films
Australian drama films
1912 drama films
1912 lost films
Lost drama films
Films directed by W. J. Lincoln
Silent drama films
1910s English-language films